Marcelo Caetano Moraes (Rio de Janeiro August 17, 1976) is a writer, professor and pianist from Brazil., critic, journalist.

He received degrees in Portuguese and Greek from the State University of Rio de Janeiro in the Portuguese language and corresponding literature (Brazilian, African and Portuguese) by the UNESA; specialist in education by Pierre-and-Marie-Curie University (University of Paris 6), specialist in planning, implementation and management of distance education by the Universidade Federal Fluminense, Professor of Language Studies and master's degree by the Catholic University of Rio de Janeiro, a researcher with dedication by the CNPq, Marcelo is also a literary critic, PhD summa cum laude by State University of Rio de Janeiro, Professor at Laureate International Universities. Doctor Honoris Causa by University of Coimbra, Portugal, and by Federação Brasileira dos Acadêmicos de Ciências, Letras e Artes. Member of International PEN Club, Académie des Arts, Sciences et Lettres de Paris and Academia de Letras y Artes de Chile.

Master works 
 Gramática Reflexiva da Língua Portuguesa (CAETANO, Marcelo. 1ª edição Rio de Janeiro: Editora Ferreira, 2009. volume 1, 704 páginas) (segunda edição, 2015)
 Gramática Normativa para o Ensino Médio (CAETANO, Marcelo. 1ª edição Rio de Janeiro: Maria Anézia, 2009. volume 1, 220 p.)
 Literatura para o Ensino Médio (CAETANO, Marcelo.1. ed. Rio de Janeiro: Maria Anézia, 2009. v. 1. 100 p.)
 Análise histórica e estilística das funções da linguagem. (CAETANO, Marcelo. Rio de Janeiro: Academia Brasileira de Filologia, 2008. v. 1. 67 p.)
 Com a palavra, os professores do Brasil. (CAETANO, M. Marcelo. Rio de Janeiro: Litteris, 2008. 1ªedição.)
 Cemitério de centauros. (CAETANO, M. Marcelo. Rio de Janeiro: SENAI, 2007. 1ª edição. 80 p.)
 Gramática Normativa da Língua Portuguesa. (CAETANO, M. Marcelo. Rio de Janeiro: SENAI, 2007. 1ª edição. 200 p.)
 Educação-Éducation-Education (Brazil, France, United Kingdom. CAETANO, M. Marcelo.Rio de Janeiro: ONU-UNESCO, 2006. 1ª edição. 280 p.)
 Romances de entressafra (CAETANO, Marcelo. São Paulo: Vivali, 2005. 1ª edição 239 p.)
 A humanidade na arca de Noé (CAETANO, Marcelo. São Paulo: Vivali, 2005. 1ª edição 430 p.)
 Solidariedade (Brazil, France, United Kingdom. CAETANO, Marcelo. Rio de Janeiro: ONU-UNESCO, 2005. 1ª edição 250 p.)
 A clara de ovo (CAETANO Marcelo. Rio de Janeiro: 7 Letras, 2003. 1ª edição 156 p.)

Some prizes 
 2008 Prize Litteris.
 2007 Prize International Bienal de Rio de Janeiro, Sesi-Firjan, Fundação Guttemberg.
 2005 Prix de Littérature Unesco, ONU-UNESCO-ABL – Paris.
 2006 Prix de Littérature Unesco, ONU-UNESCO-ABL – Paris.
 1989 competition de piano sul-americano Guiomar Novaes, Teatro Municipal Zitta de Marchi.
 1990 competition Nacional de Piano Clóvis Salgado-Palácio das Artes, UFMG
 1990 Competition Sul-Americano Artlivre, Conservatório Dramático e Musical de São Paulo.
 1990 Competition International de Piano Ciudad de Cordoba, Fundação del Teatro del Libertador San Martín, Córdoba.
 2010 Competition de Philharmonic Orchestra of Viena, Austria
 2010 Grand Prix Concurso Paulo Henriques Britto PUC-Rio, Globo Universidade, Editora Record
 2010 Fellow Pen Club Rio-London
 2011 Fellow Academía de Letras y Artes Del Chile
 2011 membre de l'Académie française des Arts, Sciences et Lettres, Médaille de Vermeil

References

External links 
 YouTube
 
 
 Marcelo Moraes Caetano, Orchestre Philarmonique de Vienne
 Marcelo Moraes Caetano, Departamento de Letras, Universidade Federal Fluminense 
 Jornal de Poesia – Marcelo Moraes Caetano

Year of birth missing (living people)
Living people
Rio de Janeiro State University alumni